In the mathematical theory of probability, multivariate Laplace distributions are extensions of the Laplace distribution and the asymmetric Laplace distribution to multiple variables.  The marginal distributions of symmetric multivariate Laplace distribution variables are Laplace distributions.  The marginal distributions of asymmetric multivariate Laplace distribution variables are asymmetric Laplace distributions.

Symmetric multivariate Laplace distribution

A typical characterization of the symmetric multivariate Laplace distribution has the characteristic function:

 

Unlike the multivariate normal distribution, even if the covariance matrix has zero covariance and correlation the variables are not independent.  The symmetric multivariate Laplace distribution is elliptical.

Probability density function
If , the probability density function (pdf) for a k-dimensional multivariate Laplace distribution becomes:

where:

In the correlated bivariate case, i.e., k = 2, with  the pdf reduces to:

where:

Asymmetric multivariate Laplace distribution

A typical characterization of the asymmetric multivariate Laplace distribution has the characteristic function:

 

As with the symmetric multivariate Laplace distribution, the asymmetric multivariate Laplace distribution has mean , but the covariance becomes .

The probability density function (pdf) for a k-dimensional asymmetric multivariate Laplace distribution is:

where:

It represents the limiting distribution for a sum of independent, identically distributed random variables with finite variance and covariance where the number of elements to be summed is itself an independent random variable distributed according to a geometric distribution. Such geometric sums can arise in practical applications within biology, economics and insurance. The distribution may also be applicable in broader situations to model multivariate data with heavier tails than a normal distribution but finite moments.

The relationship between the exponential distribution and the Laplace distribution allows for a simple method for simulating bivariate asymmetric Laplace variables (including for the case of ). Independently simulate an exponential random variables W from an Exp(1) distribution.  will be distributed (asymmetric) bivariate Laplace with mean  and covariance matrix .

References

Probability distributions
Multivariate continuous distributions
Geometric stable distributions